Goronwy ap Tudur Hen (died 1331), also known as Goronwy ap Tudur or Goronwy Fychan, was a Welsh aristocrat and Lord of Penmynydd. He was a member of the Tudor family of Penmynydd, Anglesey, North Wales, and a direct ancestor of Owen Tudor and thereby the Royal House of Tudor. He was a soldier for the English crown, who fought in the First War of Scottish Independence, including in the English invasion which led to the Battle of Bannockburn. He remained loyal to King Edward II of England until the king's death, and was both a yeoman and forester of Snowdon. After his death in 1331, his body was interred in Llanfaes Friary, near Bangor, Gwynedd.

Ancestry and family
Goronwy ap Tudur Hen was one of three sons of Welsh noble Tudur Hen (English: Tudur the Elder) and Anghared fil Ithel Fychan, alongside Madog ap Tudur Hen and Hywel ap Tudur Hen. 

Tudor Hen had first been in service to Llywelyn ap Gruffudd (also known as Llywelyn the Last), the King of Gwynedd, but retained his titles under the conquest of Wales by King Edward I of England. But during the rebellion of Madog ap Llywelyn, Tudur acted as his steward. After the rebellion failed, Tudur pledged his loyalty to Edward. 

Utilising the more advantageous property laws of England, Tudur saw to it that his lands were passed seamlessly upon his death in 1311 into the hands of Goronwy.

Service to the English crown
Goronwy ap Tudur Hen was Lord of Penmynydd and a soldier in the service of the English crown. He joined King Edward II of England for his invasion of Scotland in 1314 as part of the First War of Scottish Independence, which included service at the Battle of Bannockburn in June of that year. In 1316, a rebellion took place in Glamorgan under the leadership of Llywelyn Bren, at the same time Edward was campaigning in Scotland.

Despite this, there was little concern that it would spread to North Wales, with the royal officials instead concerned with the threat of invasion from Ireland. Some 1,500 troops were summoned from the area to support the King, and among those leading those troops were Iorweth ap Gruffudd, Gruffudd Llwyd and his cousin Goronwy ap Tudur Hen. After these troops, under the command of Gruffudd Llwyd, moved to Chester, they were dismissed on 4 August 1316 to return to North Wales in order to protect the area from the Irish threat.

Goronwy and his troops were again summoned into the King's service to retake Berwick in 1319, after Scottish forces had taken it a year earlier. The majority of the forces from Wales came from the southern Marcher Lords, but Goronwy, Gruffudd Llwyd and Hywel ap Gruffudd ap Geruath led those from the northern part of the country. Around the same time, as a yeoman of the king, Goronwy was made forester of Snowdon. He remained loyal to Edward II, but following the king's death, he resumed service to Edward III.

Goronwy married Gwerfyl ferch Madog, daughter of Madog ap Iorwerth, 3rd Baron of Hendwr. Goronwy and Gwerfyl had three sons, Tudur, Hywel, and Gruffydd. 

Goronwy was interred after his death in the west wall of the Franciscan Llanfaes Friary near Bangor, Gwynedd on 11 December 1331. His father had overseen the reconstruction efforts of the friary, and in 1311 was the first of the family to be placed there following his death. 

Other members of the family were placed there following death, until some were moved following the Dissolution of the Monasteries under the Church of England imposed by King Henry VIII of England, with Goronwy's being moved to St Gredifael's Church, Penmynydd.

Legacy
Goronwy's eldest son Hywel ap Goronwy joined the priesthood, and became a canon of Bangor Cathedral. In 1357, Hywel became the Archdeacon of Anglesey. Gruffydd drowned in 1344. 

Goronwy ap Tudur Hen was one of the direct ancestors of the Royal House of Tudor. 

His son, Tudur ap Goronwy, became a knight in the service of Edward III, and was the grandfather of Owain ap Maredudd ap Tudur (through his son, Maredudd ap Tudur, grandson to Goronwy ap Tudur Hen). Owain Anglicised his name, becoming Owen Tudor, and was himself the grandfather of King Henry VII of England, the founder of the House of Tudor.

Lineage

Notes

References

 (2 vols)

 (2 vols in 4 parts)

14th-century births
1331 deaths
Goronwy
Welsh soldiers
People from Anglesey
Year of birth unknown
14th-century Welsh people